In Ireland, the term Father of the Dáil is an unofficial title applied to the current member of Dáil Éireann with the longest unbroken period of service in the Dail, regardless of their position. The 'Father' has no official role in the business of the House as the title is honorific.

On a number of occasions two or more men have shared the position of Father of the Dáil; there has never been a female holder of the title.

James Everett was joint Father of the Dáil at his death in 1967. Oliver J. Flanagan's death occurred two months after his retirement in 1987. Neil Blaney's death in 1995 occurred while he was Father of the Dáil.

The current Fathers of the Dáil are Richard Bruton and Willie O'Dea having both been first elected to the Dáil in the February 1982 general election. Bernard Durkan was elected at the 1981 general election, but lost his seat in February 1982 and was re-elected in November 1982, so he does not have an unbroken record of service.

Fathers of the Dáil

See also
Father of the House
Baby of the Dáil
Records of members of the Oireachtas

References

Dáil Éireann
Politics of the Republic of Ireland
Senior legislators